The SS König Albert was a German Barbarossa class ocean liner owned by the Norddeutscher Lloyd Line.  Interned in Italy at the outbreak of World War I, she was seized by the Italian Government in 1915 and converted to a hospital ship.  Sold into merchant service in 1920, she was used as a transport for the Italian Navy, before being scrapped in 1926.

History

SS König Albert 
The SS König Albert was built by Stettiner Vulcan of Stettin, Germany for the Norddeutscher Lloyd Line of Bremen, and launched in 1899. She sailed on her maiden voyage from Hamburg, via the Suez Canal to the Far East. She completed eight round voyages on this service and was then transferred on 3 March 1903 to the Bremen - Cherbourg - New York City route for a single voyage.  On 16 April 1903 she went to the Genoa - Naples - New York City run and stayed mainly on this service until commencing her last voyage on 11 June 1914.

On the outbreak of World War I, SS König Albert, like many of her sister ships, was interned in a neutral country to avoid capture by the Royal Navy.  When Italy joined the war in May, 1915, the ship was seized by the Italian Government.

As the Ferdinando Palasciano 

The ship was converted to a hospital ship and renamed the Ferdinando Palasciano, after the Italian physician and politician Ferdinando Palasciano. On 20 January 1916 off the Albanian coast she was captured as a prize by the Kuk Austro-Hungarian Navy U-boat 11, and escorted into their naval base of Cattaro (the event famously painted by Alexander Kircher). She was later handed back to the Italians. The reasons for this are unknown, but possibly done due to her hospital ship status.

In 1920, the ship was chartered to Navigazione Generale Italiana of Genoa and on June 15, 1920 commenced her first voyage Genoa - Naples - New York. She completed 6 round trip voyages on this route, the last one commencing April 13, 1921.

References

External links

S.S. Konig Albert Passenger Ship at RootsWeb

Barbarossa-class ocean liners
Ships of Norddeutscher Lloyd
Hospital ships in World War I
Passenger ships of Italy
1899 ships
Ships built in Stettin
Hospital ships of Italy
Captured ships